Gregor Baumgartner (born 13 July 1979) is an Austrian former professional ice hockey winger who played the last 9 seasons of his career for EHC Black Wings Linz in the Erste Bank Eishockey Liga. He was drafted 37th overall in the 1997 NHL Entry Draft by the Montreal Canadiens and then drafted 156th overall in the 1999 NHL Entry Draft by the Dallas Stars.

Career statistics

References

External links
 

1979 births
Living people
Acadie–Bathurst Titan players
Austrian expatriate ice hockey people
Austrian expatriate sportspeople in Canada
Austrian expatriate sportspeople in the United States
Austrian ice hockey right wingers
Clarkson Golden Knights men's ice hockey players
Dallas Stars draft picks
EC Red Bull Salzburg players
EHC Black Wings Linz players
Fort Worth Brahmas players
Idaho Steelheads (WCHL) players
Kalamazoo Wings (1974–2000) players
Laval Titan Collège Français players
Montreal Canadiens draft picks
Oklahoma City Blazers (1992–2009) players
Pensacola Ice Pilots players
Utah Grizzlies (AHL) players
Vienna Capitals players
Utah Grizzlies (IHL) players